The Episcopal Diocese of Pennsylvania is a diocese of the Episcopal Church in the United States of America encompassing the counties of Philadelphia, Montgomery, Bucks, Chester and Delaware in the state of Pennsylvania.

The Diocese has 36,641 members in 2020 in 134 congregations.  In March 2016, Daniel G. P. Gutierrez was elected Bishop Diocesan; he was consecrated and assumed office on July 16, 2016. Upon becoming bishop in 2016, Gutiérrez implemented a strategy of experimentation and adaptation.

History 

Quakers founded Pennsylvania, but Anglicans were present from the beginning.  They established nine congregations, including Christ Church in Philadelphia (1695), Old Trinity Church in Oxford (1698), St. Thomas' Church in Whitemarsh (1698), St. Martin's Church in Marcus Hook (1699), St. David's Church in Radnor (1700), St. Paul's Church in Chester (1702) and St. John's Church in Concord (1702) in the colony's first twenty years.
After the American Revolution, Anglicans became known as Episcopalians. Led by the Reverend William White, they organized the Episcopal Diocese of Pennsylvania in 1784. White became the diocese's first bishop three years later, and it grew rapidly during his episcopacy (1787-1836).

In the beginning, the Diocese spanned a vast area, extending from Philadelphia to Pittsburgh. Essentially, it encompassed the whole of Pennsylvania. In 1865, a new Episcopal Diocese of Pittsburgh took responsibility for every parish west of the Alleghenies.  By 1910 there were five Episcopal dioceses in Pennsylvania, and the Diocese of Pennsylvania covered only the southeastern corner of the commonwealth.

Bishop White favored the "middle way" – a balance between individual piety and shared ritual, between parish autonomy and centralized leadership.  Some of his successors (e.g. Henry Ustick Onderdonk, 1836–1844) tried to reconcile those committed to "high" and "low" church beliefs and practices. The emergence of "liberal" theology at the end of the nineteenth century heightened tensions.

The diocese established a divinity school in 1858. Both clerks from Spring Garden (St. Jude's, 1848) and their bosses in Chestnut Hill (St. Paul's, 1856) could worship at an Episcopal church. It took account of the sick and the poor, sponsoring such organizations as Episcopal Hospital (1852) and the City Mission (1870), the forerunner of today's Episcopal Community Services.

Beginning in the 1920s and accelerating two decades later, many Episcopalians left Philadelphia altogether. New congregations appeared almost overnight in suburbs like Newtown Square (St. Alban's, 1922), Gladwyne (St. Christopher's, 1949), Levittown (St. Paul's, 1953), and Maple Glen (St. Matthews, 1967).  Others experience unprecedented growth in the 1950s (Redeemer, Bryn Mawr, 1851). Bishop Oliver J. Hart (1943-1963) wrestled with the implications of suburbanization. While the city parishes supported the creation of parishes and missions outside of Philadelphia the generation or two before, these congregations outside the city did not always empathize with the social and economic problems of their urban brethren.

African Americans have worshipped in the Diocese of Pennsylvania since its inception. As slaves and free persons, they attended services at some of its most venerable congregations.  Absalom Jones, the founder with Richard Allen of the Free African Society in 1787, organized Saint Thomas, the first independent black church in America, in 1794. Jones became an Episcopal deacon in 1795 and a priest in 1804. All-black congregations were not common in Philadelphia until the city's African American population expanded in the first half of the twentieth century. By 1980 the parish Jones once led (known today as the African Episcopal Church of Saint Thomas) had become one of the largest (black or white) in the Diocese. Many black Episcopalians now worshiped by themselves in parishes that had once been all white or integrated (Church of the Advocate, Philadelphia, 1886).

Until Robert L. DeWitt (1964-1973) became its twelfth bishop in 1964, the Diocese of Pennsylvania largely ignored the civil rights movement. During his nine years at the helm, DeWitt insisted that the Diocese acknowledge and respond to the racism and discrimination in its midst. Troubled by riots in Philadelphia and Chester, he supported an ecumenical effort to desegregate Girard College, a boarding school for orphan boys that bore the name of its nineteenth-century benefactor. He even lent his support to the idea that the best way to atone for slavery was through "reparations."

DeWitt's successor, Lyman L. Ogilby (1974-1988), inherited a Diocese that was certainly more attuned to issues of inequality and social justice than it once had been.  This new sensitivity manifested itself in July 1974 when the first women to become Episcopal priests were ordained in Philadelphia. The ceremony took place at the Church of the Advocate whose rector, the Reverend Paul M. Washington, was also an important civil rights leader. Ogilby did not participate, but neither did he stand in the way.  By then, laywomen had begun to play a significant role in the church, serving on vestries and as delegates to the diocesan conventions.  In 1986, St. Giles, Upper Darby became the first parish in the Diocese to call a woman, the Reverend Michealla Keener, to be its rector.

The place of gays and lesbians in the Diocese remained unresolved until the episcopacy of Allen L. Bartlett, Jr. (1988-1998). After prayerful consideration, he opened the door to the diaconate and the priesthood for openly gay men and women. But such reforms did not come without recrimination. Some priests and parishes withdrew from the Diocese or invited bishops from outside its borders to make pastoral visits. Bartlett tolerated these so-called "flying bishops," but his successor, Charles Bennison (1998-2012), did not. 

Following a difficult period in its life and Bishop Bennison's departure, the Diocese turned for leadership to Clifton Daniel, 3rd (2013-2016). The bishop of the Episcopal Diocese of East Carolina, beginning in 1997, came to Pennsylvania on a provisional basis and kept the Diocese on a steady course while it made plans to search for a permanent successor. Completed in 2016, that search led to the selection of Daniel G. P. Gutierrez, canon to the ordinary in the Episcopal Diocese of the Rio Grande, as the sixteenth bishop of the Episcopal Diocese of Pennsylvania.

Future 
The diocese is committed its vision of knowing Jesus and changing the world in his name. "Our vision is to know Jesus and change the world. We can do that by proclaiming the Gospel, empowering our churches, and addressing the pain and poverty. We have the gifts, resources, people, and faith. Together we are change agents for Christ." The diocese is committed to recasting assets and helping churches rediscover new ways to be the church.

Cathedral 
During the early 20th Century as the more wealthy population of the diocese was shifting west toward the "Main Line", a project was undertaken to build Cathedral Church of Christ, on Ridge Avenue in the Roxborough section of the city, but construction on the cathedral project was halted decades ago for financial reasons. A cathedral was also envisioned as part of the Washington Memorial Chapel complex at Valley Forge, but did not get much further than the laying of a cornerstone.

In 2019, after 200 years in the city of Philadelphia, the diocese moved its headquarters to Norristown reviving a previously closed church there.

Bishops of Pennsylvania
These are the bishops who have served the Diocese of Pennsylvania:
 William White (1787–1836)* Henry U. Onderdonk, Bishop Coadjutor (1827–1836)
 Henry U. Onderdonk (1836–1844)
 Alonzo Potter (1845–1865)* Samuel Bowman, Bishop Suffragan (1858–1861)* William B. Stevens, Bishop Coadjutor (1862–1865)
 William B. Stevens (1865–1887)* Ozi W. Whitaker, Bishop Coadjutor (1886–1887)
 Ozi W. Whitaker (1887–1911)* Alexander Mackay-Smith, Bishop Coadjutor (1902–1911)
 Alexander Mackay-Smith (1911)* Philip M. Rhinelander, Bishop Coadjutor (1911)
 Philip M. Rhinelander (1911–1923)* Thomas J. Garland, Bishop Suffragan (elected 1911)
 Thomas J. Garland (1924–1931)* Francis Marion Taitt, Bishop Coadjutor (1929–1931)
 Francis Marion Taitt (1931–1943)* Oliver J. Hart, Bishop Coadjutor (1942–1943)
 Oliver J. Hart (1943–1963)* William P. Remington, Bishop Suffragan (1945–1961)* J. Gillespie Armstrong, Bishop Suffragan (1949, Bishop Coadjutor (1960–1963)
 J. Gillespie Armstrong (1963–1964)* Robert L. DeWitt, Bishop Coadjutor (1964)
 Robert L. DeWitt (1964–1973)* Lyman C. Ogilby, Bishop Coadjutor (1973)
 Lyman C. Ogilby (1974–1987)* Allen L. Bartlett, Jr., Bishop Coadjutor (1986)
 Allen L. Bartlett, Jr. (1987–1998)* Franklin D. Turner, Bishop Suffragan (1988-2000)
 Charles Ellsworth Bennison, Jr. (1998–2012)* Clarence N. Coleridge (Assisting)* Clifton D. Daniel, III, Provisional Bishop (2013-2016)* Allen L. Bartlett (Assisting)* Edward Lewis Lee (Assisting)* Rodney R. Michel (Assisting)
 Daniel G. P. Gutierrez, (2016–Present)

See also
 List of bishops of the Episcopal Church in the United States of America

Notes

External links
Diocese of Pennsylvania official website
Philadelphia Cathedral official website
A History of St. Thomas' African Episcopal Church, 1794-1865, Dissertation by Thomas F. Ulle, University of Pennsylvania
Episcopal Church official website
Journal of the Annual Convention, Diocese of Pennsylvania

Diocese of Pennsylvania
1787 establishments in Pennsylvania
Pennsylvania
Christianity in Pennsylvania
Pennsylvania
 
 
Province 3 of the Episcopal Church (United States)
Religious organizations established in 1787